The Holleford Crater is a meteorite crater near the community of Holleford, part of South Frontenac, Ontario, Canada. Although there is a surface depression over the area, the crater itself is not exposed at the surface.

Holleford Crater was discovered in the 1950s during analysis of aerial photographs under the direction of Carlyle S. Beals of the Dominion Observatory in Ottawa. In the late 1950s, the Geological Survey of Canada conducted a series of four geophysical studies: magnetic observations, seismic studies, gravity studies, and a diamond drilling program. The seismic and gravity studies and the drilling all produced data consistent with the impact theory. The drill core revealed breccia and similar materials at predicted depths. The studies concluded that an ancient meteorite impact crater is present in the Precambrian bedrock below the surface.

Location 
Holleford Crater is located on the Babcook Family Homestead Farm properties (including the original Babcook Homestead Farm, established 1803, owned by the family of the late Frederick and Jean Babcook, at Hartington, Ontario (about 1/2 hour north of Kingston Ontario). (It was the birthplace of the last surviving veteran of the Canadian army in World War One, Jack Babcock, who died on February 18, 2010, at the age of 109.) 
Starting in the 1960s, the site has been visited frequently by geology students from Queen's University, at Kingston. In the 1970s, as a result of efforts by the late Frederick Babcook, an official commemorative plaque was erected along the road beside the Babcook Homestead Farm by the Province of Ontario. Queen's University's Miller Hall Museum of Geology maintains a display dedicated to the Holleford Meteorite Crater.

References

External links 

 Aerial Exploration of the Holleford Structure

Impact craters of Ontario
Proterozoic impact craters
Landforms of Frontenac County